St. Mary's Cathedral is a cathedral church located in Winnipeg, Manitoba, Canada. It is the episcopal see of the Roman Catholic Archdiocese of Winnipeg. Located at the corner of Saint Mary Avenue and Hargrave Street in downtown Winnipeg, St. Mary's is one of two Roman Catholic cathedrals in the city of Winnipeg; the other, St. Boniface Cathedral, is located across the Red River in the formerly independent city of Saint Boniface.

St. Mary's was originally designed in 1880 by C. Balston Kenway and was updated in 1896 by Samuel Hooper, an English-born stonemason and architect who was later appointed Provincial Architect of Manitoba. The building features elements of Romanesque revival and Germanic architecture.

The Institute for Stained Glass in Canada has documented the stained glass at St. Mary's Cathedral.

References

External links

Winnipeg
Roman Catholic churches in Winnipeg
1880 establishments in Canada
St._Mary's_Cathedral
Municipal Historical Resources of Winnipeg